Vintrie is a locality situated in Malmö Municipality, Skåne County, Sweden with 670 inhabitants in 2010.

References 

Neighbourhoods of Malmö
Populated places in Malmö Municipality
Populated places in Skåne County